Does is the second album by indie rock band The Slip.  It was released in 2000 on Butch Trucks' record label, Flying Frog Records.

Track listing
"Catacea" – 2:43
"So Dope" – 5:35
"Paint Cans" – 1:13
"The Invocation" – 4:10
"Johnny's Tune" – 6:54
"When Cloudy Hushes Moon" – 5:06
"A Crack in the Sundial" – 6:44
"Hallway" – 0:19
"My Room" – 4:38
"Hey Worrier" – 4:53
"Tohu Bohu" – 7:01
"Rhythm and Gold" – 8:11
"S'Debatable" – 5:51
Untitled – 3:34

References

External links

2000 albums
The Slip (band) albums